Sharikabad may refer to:
 Sharikabad, Hormozgan
 Sharikabad, Faryab, Kerman Province
 Sharikabad, Kahnuj, Kerman Province
 Sharikabad, Qaleh Ganj, Kerman Province
 Sharikabad, alternate name of Suragabad, Qaleh Ganj, Kerman Province
 Sharikabad, Rudbar-e Jonubi, Kerman Province
 Sharikabad, Sirjan, Kerman Province
 Sharikabad, Chahar Gonbad, Sirjan County Kerman Province
 Sharikabad-e Mokhtar Abbaslu, Kerman Province
 Sharikabad-e Olya, Kerman Province